The 2017 MTV Video Music Awards were held on August 27, 2017 at The Forum in Inglewood, California, honoring music videos released between June 25, 2016 and June 23, 2017. It was hosted by Katy Perry. The 34th annual award show aired live from the venue for the second time in its history. The music video for Taylor Swift's song "Look What You Made Me Do" premiered during the broadcast. Lil Yachty co-hosted the pre-show with Terrence J, Charlamagne Tha God, and MTV News' Gaby Wilson, while Gabbie Hanna hosted backstage for the show. It was broadcast across various Viacom networks and their related apps.

Compared to the previous year, viewership was down from 6.5 million to 5.68 million viewers, making it the lowest viewed show since 1994. A combination of having to compete with the season finale of HBO's Game of Thrones, which drew over 12.07 million viewers, and the ability to now stream the award show online is said to account for the drop in viewership.

Performances

Source:

Appearances

Pre-show
 Gaby Wilson — announced the winners of Best Choreography and Song of the Summer

Main show
 Jack McBrayer, Buzz Aldrin, Peggy Whitson, Abbi Jacobson, Kathryn Hahn and Kevin Bacon — appeared in a skit with host Katy Perry
 Paris Jackson — presented Best Pop Video
 Hailee Steinfeld — introduced Julia Michaels
 Yara Shahidi — introduced Shawn Mendes
 Jack Antonoff and Alessandra Ambrosio — introduced Lorde
 Teyana Taylor and Pete Wentz — presented Best Dance Video
 Fred Armisen — appeared in a skit with host Katy Perry
 DJ Khaled — introduced Fifth Harmony
 Ludacris and Olivia Munn — presented Best Collaboration
 Jared Leto — paid tribute to Chester Bennington and Chris Cornell and introduced a clip of Linkin Park's 2010 VMA performance
 Billy Eichner — appeared in a skit with host Katy Perry
 Pete Davidson and Tiffany Haddish — presented Best Hip Hop Video
 Cardi B — introduced Demi Lovato
 Ellen DeGeneres — presented the Video Vanguard Award
 Millie Bobby Brown — presented Artist of the Year
 Vanessa Hudgens — introduced Alessia Cara
 Kesha — introduced Logic, Khalid and Alessia Cara
 Bebe Rexha and The Chainsmokers — presented Best New Artist
 Lil Yachty — introduced Thirty Seconds to Mars
 Rev. Robert Wright Lee IV — gave a speech denouncing racism and introduced Susan Bro
 Susan Bro — spoke about the Heather Heyer Foundation and presented Best Fight Against the System
 Hailey Baldwin — introduced Rod Stewart and DNCE
 Gal Gadot — presented Video of the Year
 Noah Cyrus — introduced Katy Perry and Nicki Minaj

Source:

Winners and nominees
The list of nominations was revealed on July 25, 2017. For the nominations, MTV continued to eliminate gender-specific awards categories, as they did at the 2017 MTV Movie & TV Awards. MTV also announced the "Moonman" statue would be renamed a "Moon Person". The Best Female and Best Male Video awards were replaced with one category, Artist of the Year. Kendrick Lamar leads the list of nominees with eight categories, while Katy Perry, The Weeknd, and DJ Khaled received the second most nods with five. Nominees for Song of the Summer category were announced on August 22, 2017. Winners are listed in bold.

Video of the Year
Kendrick Lamar — "Humble"
 Alessia Cara — "Scars to Your Beautiful"
 DJ Khaled (featuring Rihanna and Bryson Tiller) — "Wild Thoughts"
 Bruno Mars — "24K Magic"
 The Weeknd — "Reminder"

Artist of the Year
Ed Sheeran
 Ariana Grande
 Kendrick Lamar
 Lorde
 Bruno Mars
 The Weeknd

Best New Artist
Khalid
 Noah Cyrus
 Kodak Black
 Julia Michaels
 SZA
 Young M.A

Best Collaboration
Zayn and Taylor Swift — "I Don't Wanna Live Forever"
 The Chainsmokers (featuring Halsey) — "Closer"
 DJ Khaled (featuring Rihanna and Bryson Tiller) — "Wild Thoughts"
 DRAM (featuring Lil Yachty) — "Broccoli"
 Calvin Harris (featuring Pharrell Williams, Katy Perry and Big Sean) — "Feels"
 Charlie Puth (featuring Selena Gomez) — "We Don't Talk Anymore"

Best Pop
Fifth Harmony (featuring Gucci Mane) — "Down"
Miley Cyrus — "Malibu"
Shawn Mendes — "Treat You Better"
Katy Perry (featuring Skip Marley) – "Chained to the Rhythm"
Ed Sheeran — "Shape of You"
Harry Styles — "Sign of the Times"

Best Hip Hop
Kendrick Lamar — "Humble"
 Big Sean — "Bounce Back"
 Chance the Rapper — "Same Drugs"
 DJ Khaled (featuring Justin Bieber, Quavo, Chance the Rapper and Lil Wayne) — "I'm the One"
 DRAM (featuring Lil Yachty) — "Broccoli"
 Migos (featuring Lil Uzi Vert) — "Bad and Boujee"

Best Dance
Zedd and Alessia Cara — "Stay"
 Afrojack (featuring Ty Dolla $ign) — "Gone"
 Calvin Harris — "My Way"
 Kygo and Selena Gomez — "It Ain't Me"
 Major Lazer (featuring Justin Bieber and MØ) — "Cold Water"

Best Rock
Twenty One Pilots — "Heavydirtysoul"
 Coldplay — "A Head Full of Dreams"
 Fall Out Boy — "Young and Menace"
 Foo Fighters — "Run"
 Green Day — "Bang Bang"

Best Fight Against the System
Big Sean — "Light" 
Alessia Cara — "Scars to Your Beautiful" 
The Hamilton Mixtape (K'naan, Snow Tha Product, Riz MC and Residente) – "Immigrants (We Get the Job Done)" 
John Legend — "Surefire"
Logic (featuring Damian Lemar Hudson) – "Black Spiderman" 
Taboo (featuring Shailene Woodley) – "Stand Up / Stand N Rock #NoDAPL "

Best Cinematography
Kendrick Lamar — "Humble." (Director of Photography: Scott Cunningham)
 DJ Shadow (featuring Run the Jewels) — "Nobody Speak" (Director of Photography: David Proctor)
 Halsey — "Now or Never" (Director of Photography: Kristof Brandl)
 Imagine Dragons — "Thunder" (Director of Photography: Matthew Wise)
 Ed Sheeran — "Castle on the Hill" (Director of Photography: Steve Annis)

Best Direction
Kendrick Lamar — "Humble." (Directors: Dave Meyers and The Little Homies)
 Alessia Cara — "Scars to Your Beautiful" (Director: Aaron A)
 Bruno Mars — "24K Magic" (Directors: Cameron Duddy and Bruno Mars)
 Katy Perry (featuring Skip Marley) — "Chained to the Rhythm" (Director: Mathew Cullen)
 The Weeknd — "Reminder" (Director: Glenn Michael)

Best Art Direction
Kendrick Lamar — "Humble." (Art Director: Spencer Graves)
 DJ Khaled (featuring Rihanna and Bryson Tiller) — "Wild Thoughts" (Art Director: Damian Fyffe)
 Bruno Mars — "24K Magic" (Art Director: Alex Delgado)
 Katy Perry (featuring Migos) — "Bon Appétit" (Art Director: Natalie Groce)
 The Weeknd — "Reminder" (Art Directors: Lamar C Taylor and KID. STUDIO)

Best Visual Effects
Kendrick Lamar — "Humble." (Visual Effects: Jonah Hall of Timber)
 Kyle (featuring Lil Yachty) — "iSpy" (Visual Effects: Max Colt and Tomash Kuzmytskyi of GloriaFX)
 Katy Perry (featuring Skip Marley) — "Chained to the Rhythm" (Visual Effects: MIRADA)
 Harry Styles — "Sign of the Times" (Visual Effects: Cédric Nivoliez of ONE MORE)
 A Tribe Called Quest — "Dis Generation" (Visual Effects: Brandon Hirzel of Bemo)

Best Choreography
Kanye West — "Fade" (Choreographers: Teyana Taylor, Guapo, Matthew Pasterisa, Jae Blaze and Derek Watkins)
 Fifth Harmony (featuring Gucci Mane) — "Down" (Choreographer: Sean Bankhead)
 Ariana Grande (featuring Nicki Minaj) — "Side to Side" (Choreographers: Brian and Scott Nicholson)
 Kendrick Lamar — "Humble." (Choreographer: Dave Meyers)
 Sia — "The Greatest" (Choreographer: Ryan Heffington)

Best Editing
Young Thug — "Wyclef Jean" (Editors: Ryan Staake and Eric Degliomini)
 The Chainsmokers (featuring Halsey) — "Closer" (Editor: Jennifer Kennedy)
 Future — "Mask Off" (Editor: Vinnie Hobbs of VHPost)
 Lorde — "Green Light" (Editor: Nate Gross of Exile Edit)
 The Weeknd — "Reminder" (Editor: Red Barbaza)

Song of the Summer
Lil Uzi Vert — "XO Tour Llif3"
 Camila Cabello (featuring Quavo) — "OMG"
 DJ Khaled (featuring Rihanna and Bryson Tiller) — "Wild Thoughts"
 Fifth Harmony (featuring Gucci Mane) — "Down"
 Luis Fonsi and Daddy Yankee (featuring Justin Bieber) — "Despacito (Remix)"
 Demi Lovato — "Sorry Not Sorry"
 Shawn Mendes — "There's Nothing Holdin' Me Back"
 Ed Sheeran — "Shape of You"

Michael Jackson Video Vanguard Award
 Pink

See also
2017 MTV Europe Music Awards

References

External links
Official website

MTV Video Music
MTV Video Music Awards
2017 in Los Angeles County, California
MTV Video Music Awards
MTV Video Music Awards
MTV Video Music Awards ceremonies